Dry Creek is a stream in Redwood and Cottonwood counties, in the U.S. state of Minnesota. It is a tributary of the Cottonwood River.

Dry Creek was named from the fact it is a losing stream during times of drought.

See also
List of rivers of Minnesota

References

Rivers of Cottonwood County, Minnesota
Rivers of Redwood County, Minnesota
Rivers of Minnesota